Hasan Abad Metro Station is a station in Tehran Metro Line 2. It is located in the junction of Imam Khomeini Street and Hafez Street in Si-o-Yek Shahrivar Square. It is between Imam Khomeini Metro Station and Imam Ali University Metro Station.

References

Tehran Metro stations